James Macintosh (21 December 1830 – 16 April 1904) was a member of the Victorian Legislative Assembly.

He came to Melbourne, Victoria, Australia in 1853 and took up farming on the Saltwater River. In 1855, he married Isabella M'Crae in 1855, with whom he was to have seven sons and one daughter. In the same year, he purchased a farm at Yangardook, and in 1867, he purchased the Oak Park farm in Rockbank.

Macintosh was a member of the Victorian Legislative Assembly from October 1859 to July 1861 for East Bourke. He died in Braybrook in 1904.

References

1830 births
1904 deaths
Members of the Victorian Legislative Assembly
Scottish emigrants to Australia
19th-century Australian politicians
People from Rockbank, Victoria
Victoria (Australia) politicians
Australian farmers
People from Argyll and Bute